Tourette's, or Tourette syndrome, is a neurological condition.

Tourette, Tourettes, or Tourrettes may also refer to:
 Georges Gilles de la Tourette (1857–1904), French physician who described the syndrome

Music
 Tourettes (band), a heavy metal band
 "tourette's", a 1993 song by Nirvana from In Utero

Places
 Tourrettes, Var, a commune in southeastern France
 La Tourette, a commune in central France

Other uses
 Tourette (automobile) a three-wheel microcar
 Tourette, a character in Vampire: The Masquerade – Bloodlines

People with the surname
 Donny Tourette (born 1985), of the band Towers of London

See also
 "Le Petit Tourette", an episode of South Park
 Turret (disambiguation)